Praseodymium(III) chloride is the inorganic compound with the formula PrCl3. Like other lanthanide trichlorides, it exists both in the anhydrous and hydrated forms. It is a blue-green solid that rapidly absorbs water on exposure to moist air to form a light green heptahydrate.

Preparation
Praseodymium(III) chloride is prepared by treating praseodymium metal with hydrogen chloride:
2 Pr + 6 HCl  → 2 PrCl3 + 3 H2
It is usually purified by vacuum sublimation.

Hydrated salts of praseodymium(III) chloride can be prepared by treatment of either praseodymium metal or praseodymium(III) carbonate with hydrochloric acid:
Pr2(CO3)3  +  6 HCl  +  15 H2O  →   2 [Pr(H2O)9]Cl3  +  3 CO2

PrCl3∙7H2O is a hygroscopic substance, that will not crystallize from the mother liquor unless it is left to dry in a desiccator. Anhydrous PrCl3 can be made by thermal dehydration of the hydrate at 400 °C in the presence of ammonium chloride, the so-called ammonium chloride route. Alternatively the hydrate can be dehydrated using thionyl chloride.

Reactions
Praseodymium(III) chloride is Lewis acidic, classified as "hard" according to the HSAB concept. Rapid heating of the hydrate may cause small amounts of hydrolysis. PrCl3 forms a stable Lewis acid-base complex K2PrCl5 by reaction with potassium chloride; this compound shows interesting optical and magnetic properties.

Aqueous solutions of praseodymium(III) chloride can be used to prepare insoluble praseodymium(III) compounds. For example, praseodymium(III) phosphate and praseodymium(III) fluoride can be prepared by reaction with potassium phosphate and sodium fluoride, respectively:

PrCl3  + K3PO4  → PrPO4 + 3 KCl
PrCl3 + 3 NaF → PrF3 + 3 NaCl
2PrCl3 + 3 Na2CO3----> Pr2CO3 + 6NaCl
When heated with alkali metal chlorides, it forms a series of ternary (compounds containing three different elements) materials with the formulae MPr2Cl7, M3PrCl6, M2PrCl5, and M3Pr2Cl9 where M = K, Rb, Cs.

References

Further reading
 CRC Handbook of Chemistry and Physics (58th edition), CRC Press, West Palm Beach, Florida, 1977.
 N. N. Greenwood, A. Earnshaw, Chemistry of the Elements, Pergamon Press, 1984.
 S. Sugiyama, T. Miyamoto, H. Hayashi, M. Tanaka, J. B. Moffatt, "Effects of chlorine additives in the gas- and solid-phases on the oxidative dehydrogenation of ethane over praseodymium oxide", Journal of Molecular Catalysis A, 118, 129-136 (1997).
 

Chlorides
Praseodymium compounds
Lanthanide halides